The S4M was a Soviet special service pistol.
It was a simple break-open, two-shot derringer, but the unique features came from its specialized ammunition, designed around a cut-down version of the 7.62×39mm rounds used in the Soviet AK-47. The casings of the round contained a piston-like plunger between the bullet and the powder that would move forward inside the casing when fired. The piston would push the round down the barrel and plug the end of the casing, completely sealing off any explosive gases in the casing. This, combined with the inherently low-velocity round resulted in a truly silent pistol. The nature of the gun and ammunition led to it being wildly inaccurate outside of point-blank range. To add further confusion and throw possible suspicion away from the assassin, the barrel rifling was designed to affect the bullet in such a way that ballistics experts would not only conclude that the round was fired from an AK-47, but that the round was fired from several hundred feet away.

Due to the politically devastating nature inherent in this design, the S4M was kept highly secret. Information on the pistol was not known by western governments until well after the end of the Cold War.

The S4M was succeeded by a less powerful, but otherwise fairly similar, MSP using the newer SP-3 ammunition in 7.62×39mm, which also used in the NRS knife.

See also
 Derringer
PSS Silent Pistol
TKB-506
List of Russian weaponry

References

External links
 S4M silent pistol at Modern Firearms

Pistols of the Soviet Union
Insurgency weapons
Multiple-barrel firearms
7.62 mm firearms
Military equipment introduced in the 1960s